The 1907 Voisin biplane (designated the Voisin II by the 1913 edition of Jane's All the World's Aircraft), was the first successful powered aircraft designed by aeronautical engineer and manufacturer Gabriel Voisin. It was used by the French aviator Henri Farman to make the first heavier-than-air flight lasting more than a minute in Europe, and also to make the first full circle.
The first examples of the aircraft were known by the name of their owners, for instance the Delagrange I, or the Henri Farman n°1. Farman made many modifications to his aircraft, and these were incorporated into later production aircraft built by Voisin. The type enjoyed widespread success, and around sixty were built.

Background
Between 1904 and 1908 there was fierce competition between European aviation experimenters attempting to achieve powered heavier-than-air flight. As a result, many people did not believe the claims of the Wright Brothers until Wilbur Wright's demonstrations at Le Mans in France during August 1908, when their advance in airplane control was obviously apparent.

In 1906 Alberto Santos-Dumont had made Europe's first officially recognised heavier-than-air powered flights using his 14-bis aircraft, witnessed by officials from the Aero Club de France. The successful flights made in 1907–1908 by Léon Delagrange and Henri Farman in their Voisin aircraft put the Voisin brothers at the forefront of European aviation development.

Design and development
After assisting Ernest Archdeacon with his gliding experiments in 1904 Gabriel Voisin briefly entered a partnership with Louis Blériot in 1905.  After the failure of their second aircraft, the Bleriot IV, the partnership was dissolved in November 1906. After parting from Blériot, Gabriel Voisin set up his own aircraft construction company, Les Frères Voisin, in partnership with his brother Charles. The first powered aircraft designed by the Voisin brothers was built for Henry Kapferer, Henri Deutsch de la Meurthe's nephew. It was completed in March 1907 but never flew. Kapferer had insisted on a Buchet gasoline engine which developed only 20 horsepower, which was inadequate to achieve flight.

Early flights

At the same time, the Voisin brothers and their draughtsman Maurice Colliex were building a similar aircraft, which had been ordered by the sculptor Léon Delagrange. This became known as the Delagrange I, since the Voisin brothers had decided that the aircraft they built would bear the name of their owner prominently placed on the tail surfaces, "Voisin Frères"  appearing underneath in much smaller lettering.  This was done because Voisin believed that people would be more ready to buy aircraft if the glory of flying them went to them rather than the builder.  This practise is a source of confusion to historians and was also to lead to considerable resentment on Gabriel Voisin's part, since the focus of attention was indeed generally on the pilots rather than on those who were responsible for the design and construction of the aircraft.

A biplane elevator was carried in front of the wings on the end of a short nacelle and a boxkite-like biplane empennage of half the span of the mainplanes with three vertical surfaces each carrying a trailing-edge rudder was carried on booms behind the wings. The undercarriage consisted of a pair of wheels on v-struts under the trailing edge of the wings and small wheels mounted at the ends of the lower tailbooms. There was no provision for direct lateral control. Before Wilbur Wright's flying demonstrations in France August 1908 the importance of roll control to make controlled turns was not appreciated by European experimenters, who concentrated on attempting to produce inherently stable and practical  aircraft.

The first attempt to fly the aircraft was made by Gabriel Voisin on 28 February 1907 at the Polygon de Vincennes, but the lower booms supporting the tail failed when he attempted to lift off. After repairs a second attempt was made on 16 March, but on lifting off the engine torque drove the left-hand wing onto the ground, ending the attempted flight. This problem was overcome by adding  ballast to the right wing. The aircraft was then fitted with floats and a series of unsuccessful trials were made on the Lac d'Enghien, following which the wheels were replaced. Delagrange made two short flights at Issy les Moulineaux on 2 November 1907, but on 6 November another flight ended in a crash in which the aircraft was damaged beyond repair. Delagrange promptly ordered a second aircraft, later called the Delagrange II.

Farman's successes
 A second machine, identical apart from slight changes to the undercarriage, was ordered by Henry Farman in July 1907 and first flew on 30 September 1907. Named Henri Farman n°1 (as painted on the vertical tail), this became known as the Voisin-Farman, or, later, the Farman I

This flight won prizes awarded by the AeCF for flights of over 300 and 500 metres and also gained the Archdeacon Cup for the greatest distance flown.

Later that year Farman had made some modifications to the aircraft, replacing the biplane front elevator with a single surface.  The tail surfaces had been reduced in span. In the original tail assembly the upper surface was a lifting surface, while the lower was a non-lifting surface intended to act as a stabiliser: in the new arrangement both surfaces contributed lift.  The wings had been re-rigged with dihedral to give spiral stability and allow some roll control  despite of ailerons or wing warping lacking features. Following Henri Fabre sound advice, and overcoming Voisin disinterest,  Farman had been added a cloth fairing upon the external aft spars of the wings in order to reduce the drag.     
Further flights were made in November, in which he made his first turns, and on 13 January 1908 he won the 50,000 francs Deutsch de la Meurthe-Archdeacon Grand Prix de l'Aviation for being the first aviator to complete an officially observed 1 kilometre closed circuit flight, including taking off and landing under the aircraft's own power.

Development in 1908

In March 1908 a period of intense competition between Farman and Delagrange began, Delagrange now flying the new Delagrange II incorporating the modifications that had been made to Farman's aircraft, now renamed the Farman Ibis and with a new covering of "Continental" brand rubberised balloon fabric replacing the original varnished silk. On 21 March Farman set a new record with a flight of just over 2 kilometres (1.25  miles). In May both aircraft were fitted with side curtains between the inner set of interplane struts, and on May 30, while giving a series of demonstration flights in Italy, he succeeded in making a flight of  lasting 15 minutes 25 seconds. This time was bettered by Farman on 6 July, when he made a flight lasting 20 min 20 sec, a new record and winning Farman a 10,000 franc prize for the first officially observed flight lasting more than fifteen minutes.

The distinctive 'side curtains' between the outer two sets of interplane struts that were to become characteristic of subsequent production aircraft were added to both aircraft by the end of September.   By 30 October, when Farman made a  flight from Bouy to Reims, the first cross country flight in aviation history, ailerons had been added to his aircraft.   Farman's last modification was to fit a third, shorter wing, in which form it became known as the Henry Farman Triplane.

Production aircraft

Farman finally ended his collaboration with Voisin Frères after a disagreement over an aircraft they had built to his specifications and then sold to John Moore-Brabazon, who named the aircraft the Bird of Passage. This caused Farman to start building aircraft himself, the first of which was the Farman III. Although it had the side curtains that had been added to the Farman I it did not have ailerons.

Armand Zipfel was one of the first to buy a Voisin aircraft, which he took to Berlin in January 1909 to make one of the first public demonstrations of heavier-than-air flight in Germany, organised by the Berliner Lokal Anzeiger.

French aviator Albert Kimmerling made what is possibly the first manned, heavier-than-air powered flight in Africa by taking off from the Nahoon Racecourse East London, South Africa in a Voisin on 28 December 1909.

Henri Brégi took two examples to Argentina and made the first aeroplane flight in Argentina on 6 February 1910.

Around sixty were eventually built, with a variety of engines according to the wishes of the buyer. Among these were the aircraft in which Captain Ferber was killed and the example flown by Louis Paulhan, which was the first aircraft to fly powered by a Gnome Omega rotary engine. Another example was bought by Harry Houdini, who took it to Australia and made a series of flights at Diggers Rest near Melbourne in March 1910. Although claimed to be the first flights made in Australia, some short flights had been made by Colin Defries in December 1909, but Houdini's flights are credited with being the first sustained and controlled flights made in Australia.

Specifications

See also
 Harry Houdini: The Aviator — Houdini's flight at Diggers Rest, Friday, 18 March 1910.

Notes

References

Bibliography 
 
 
 
 Sharpe, Michael (2000) Biplanes, Triplanes, and Seaplanes London: Friedman/Fairfax Books 

Translation of Mes 10,000 Cerfs-volants, 1960, Editions de la Table Ronde, Paris.

Further reading 
 Gabriel Voisin, "Henry Farman" in "Pionniers", Revue Aeronautique des Vieilles Tiges, No 7, page 13, January 1966.

External links

 Footage of aircraft labeled "Henri Farman No. 1", at Issy-les-Moulineaux, France, in 1908.
 Photo of 1907 biplane in Argentina (es)

II
1900s French experimental aircraft
Single-engined pusher aircraft
Biplanes
Canard aircraft
Aircraft first flown in 1907